Helmut Zenker (January 11, 1949 - January 7, 2003) was an Austrian writer, songwriter and screenwriter.

Life 
Helmut was born on January 11, 1949, in the lower Austrian city of St. Valentin. Not much is known about his early life or his parents or siblings.

He studied at a teaching academy in Vienna and worked at primary and special schools in Vienna and Tyrol. He also worked as a truck driver and projectionist.

In 1969, he founded Wespennest, a literary magazine, with Peter Henisch.

Starting in 1973, Zenker became a freelance writer and participated in author readings, including at the left-wing festival, Volksstimmfest, located in the Prater.

Helmut is the father of Tibor Zenker (7 March 1976) who, as of February 2021, is the chairman of the Party of Labor of Austria.

Writing 

Zenker began his writing career in 1974 with a series of books about the Viennese police major Adolf Kottan, but it was not published. He turned the book into a radio drama which was produced in 1975 by the SWF.

Helmut saw great success in 1976. His first play, "Insanely Happy" was directed by Gustav Manker and premiered at the Vienna Volkstheater starring Karlheinz Hackl and included Rudolf Jusits. Major Kottan saw his screen debut in a 90-minutes television film at ORF. It was directed by Peter Patzak who also staged all other Kottan episodes. The series produced from 1976 to 1983 Kottan gained particular popularity with Lukas Resetarits in the lead role.

In 1990, Zenker founded CABAL Buchmacher in which only books by Helmut Zenker were published.

From 1990 to 1998, the successful TV series Tohuwabohu, written by Zenker, was produced starring Jazz Gitti, Franz Suhrada and Ossy Kolmann.

In 2010, a new Kottan Investigates movie called "Rien ne va Plus" and was reminiscent of James Bond. The script was written by Helmut's son, Jan, and the film was directed by Peter Patzek. Lukas Resetarits reprises his role or the main character.

In November 2016, "Kottan - Der Puppenmusical" was performed in Vienna's Rabenhof Theatre. It starred Christian Dolezal and Nikolaus Habjan worked the puppets. Zenker's son, Tibor, has commented that he thought his dad would have enjoyed the show. Tibor was co-author of the musical.

Politics 

Zenker was a member of the Communist Party of Austria.

Death 

He died on January 7, 2003, in Vienna, Austria, at the age of 53 years just 3 days before his birthday. The cause of death was renal failure due to a tumor. He is buried in an honorary grave in Vienna Central Cemetery. (group 40, number 89)

Cover Art 

The single by Hans Krankl used for the Lonely Boys had an album cover painted by Sammy Konkolits.

Works 

Mystery Novels
 Kottan Investigates (books, TV episodes, comics and audio)
Middle Austria 
Threatening Letters 
Sleep 
Danger of Firing 
The Fourth Man 
History from the Viennese Forest 
Hartl Lane 16a 
Inspector Gives Kan 
Lonely Boys 
Death of a Vending Machine Operator 
Burli (audio)
Headstand (audio)
Faithful (audio)
Beautiful Italy (audio)
Ping Pong (audio)
Rabengasse 3a (audio)
The Letter of the Minister (audio)
New Comicstrips 1 (comics)
New Comicstrips 4 (comics)
Comicstrips 6 (comics)
A feast for Heribert: Kottan Comic No. 5 (comics)
Burli: Kottan Comic Nr. 6 (comics)
Middle Vienna: Kottan Comic Special Edition No. 1 (comics)
Threatening letters: Kottan Comic Special Edition No. 2 (comics)
No Case for Kottan, Episode 4 (TV)
Break with Consequences, Episode 5 (TV)
Genius and Chance, Episode 14 (TV)
The Ducks of the President, Episode 15 
Smokey and Baby and Bear, Episode 16 
My Hobby - Murder, Episode 17 
Mabuse Returns, Episode 19 (TV)
Murder 1927, Episode 25 (TV)
 Minni Mann
Detective 
The Man Himself 
The Man is Dead and Sends His Regards 
The Man in the Moon 
Little Man - What Now? 
Rummy Blach
Introduction (audio)
Lonely Boys (audio)
Keep Swinging (audio)
Above All Treetops is Peace (audio)
You Are Going To Die Happy With Me (audio)
Nothing Works (1990) (audio)
Viennese Blood (audio)
Murder of My Dreams (audio)
Dirty Rummy (audio)
Dying is Forbidden (audio)
The Emperor Sends Out His Soldiers (audio)
Here Comes the Night (audio)
Sigurd Returns (audio)
Mother, Father, Child (audio)
While the Tequila Lasts (audio)
 Neon City, 1991

Poems and Prose
 1972 Action Cleanliness (poems and prose) 
 2003 Lunar Stories (short prose) 

Children's Novels
 1976: Mr. Novak Makes Stories 
 1977: Martin the Dragon 
 1988: Martin the Dragon and the Kidnapped Ghost 
 1991: Kassandro

Anthology
 1975: Köck
 1978: The Removal of the Caretaker 

Novels
 1973: Who Are the Strangers Here? 
 1974: Kassbach 
 1974: For Someone Like You (with Friedemann Bayer)
 1977: The Frog Festival 
 1988: Hinterland 
 2009: The Gymnast 
 2014: Fabulous Fables 

Other writings
 1978: The High School Student (narration)
 2003: Tohuwabohu (book to the television series)

Radio Plays
 1975: "Kottan Identified" (SWF / ORF)
 1976: "The Representative" (together with Gernot Wolfgruber)
 1976: "Mother, Father, Child" (together with Gernot Wolfgruber) SWF
 1977: "The Window" (SR / WDR)
 1978: "High Noon" (together with Gernot Wolfgruber)
 1979: "Supply and Demand" (SWF)
 1979: "Chance" (ORF / Styria)

TV Movies
 Kottan Investigates, 1976–1985, directed by Peter Patzak
 Now or Never, 1980, directed by Peter Patzak
 Thought Chain, 1979, directed by Dieter Lemmel
 Match, 1980, directed by Peter Patzak
 Beruf Santa Claus, 1981, Director Ernst Josef Lauscher
 The Investigator, 1985
 The Fourth Man, 1991–1995 Director Kurt Junek
 Tohuwabohu, 1990–1998

Movies
 1978: Kassbach – Ein Porträt, directed by Peter Patzak, with Walter Kohut, Davy, Buchrieser, Hanno Pöschl, Heinz Petters, Erni Mangold, Heinrich Strobele
 1978: Schwitzkasten, directed by John Cook, with Hermann Juranek, Christa Schubert
 1981: , directed by Peter Patzak, with Franz Buchrieser, Walter Davy, Peter Neubauer, Frank Gorshin, Bibiane Zeller, Lukas Resetarits, Maria Bill, Broderick Crawford
 1983: Artichoke, directed by John Cook, with Maryline Abecassis, Catherine Dressler, Johanna Froidl, Sibylle Kos, Michael Riebl
 1984: , directed by Peter Patzak, with Art Metrano, Eddie Constantine, Veronika Faber, Heinz Moog, William Berger, Lukas Resetarits

Play
 1976: "Insanely happy" (folk play) Volkstheater Wien

References

External links 

 Helmut Zenker (IMDB)
 Songs Written by Helmut Zenker

Burials at the Vienna Central Cemetery
Austrian male writers
Austrian mystery writers
1949 births
2003 deaths